Clive Stephen Barry (2 September 1922 – 25 August 2003) was an Australian novelist and inaugural winner of the Guardian Fiction Prize, described by the Oxford Companion to Australian Literature as a "vivid stylist with a capacity for dry humour".

Background
At only sixteen years of age Barry served in World War II – falsifying his date of birth in order to enlist. He was mentioned in despatches and went missing in action before he was reported in The Sydney Morning Herald to be a POW in Italy. He escaped two years later and crawled barefoot, without food or water, over the Dolomites to Switzerland. His experiences inside the POW would directly influence his 1965 novel Crumb Borne.

In 1961 he was appointed the United Nations representative in the Congo.

See also
List of solved missing person cases

References

1922 births
1930s missing person cases
2003 deaths
Australian Army personnel of World War II
Australian Army soldiers
Australian escapees
Australian prisoners of war
Escapees from Italian detention
Formerly missing people
Missing in action of World War II
Missing person cases in Italy
World War II prisoners of war held by Italy
Writers from New South Wales